Mihály Varga (born 26 January 1965) is a Hungarian politician, current Minister of Finance (previously Minister of National Economy) since 2013. He also served as Minister of Finance between 2001 and 2002. He has been a member of Fidesz since the party's founding in 1988. He was one of the party's four vice presidents between 2005 and 2013.

Early life and education
Varga studied at Gábor Áron Secondary School in Karcag and finishing in 1983. He graduated in trade from Karl Marx University of Economic Science of Budapest in 1989. After defending his thesis he served as an auditor at the State Construction Company No. 43 in Budapest, and then became an economist at the East Hungary Water Planning Company in Szolnok in 1990.

Political career
At the end of December 1988 he joined the Alliance of Young Democrats (Fidesz). He was the founder of the Szolnok county Fidesz group. He became a member of Fidesz's National Board in 1990, and served as its chairman in 1992-93. From 1993 to 1995 he was chairman of the party's organisation in Jász-Nagykun-Szolnok County. From 1994 to 2003 he was the party's national deputy chairman, a member of the National Board and director of the party's Management Office. He has chaired the Karcag constituency since the autumn of 2003. He has been a member of the Parliament since 1990 elected from the national list in 1990 and co-opted on 26 September 1994; elected to represent: Constituency 8, Karcag, Jász-Nagykun-Szolnok County in 1998. From 1995 to 1998 he was Deputy Group Leader.

From 14 July 1998 to 31 December 2000 he was Parliamentary Secretary of the Ministry of Finance. From 1 January 2001 to 27 May 2002 he served as Minister of Finance. He secured an individual mandate from Karcag once again in the 2002 parliamentary elections. On finishing his governmental duties he became leader of the Budget and Finance Committee. He secured a seat in Parliament in the 2006 general elections from Jász-Nagykun-Szolnok county 8.constituency. He was elected chairman of the Committee on Budget, Finance and Audit Office on 30 May 2006.

Varga became state secretary of the Prime Minister's Office in 2010. His role was to maintain a contact between the Prime Minister Viktor Orbán and the ministers. He was appointed Minister without portfolio for liaising with international financial organisations, replacing Tamás Fellegi, on 2 June 2012. Varga was succeeded by János Lázár as Head of the Prime Minister's Office.

He was appointed Minister of National Economy on 4 March 2013, replacing György Matolcsy. The position was renamed the Minister of Finance on 18 May 2018.

Other activities
 European Bank for Reconstruction and Development (EBRD), Ex-Officio Member of the Board of Governors (since 2013)

Public life
He served as vice president of the Hungarian - Kazakh Friendship Society from 1997. In 2000 he became a member of the Order of the Knights of St. John. He became presbyter of the Reformed Church of Karcag and a member of the Rákóczi Association in 2001. In 2003 he became Chairman of the Nagykun Civic Association. He is an honorary professor of the Szolnok Business School (Szolnoki Gazdasági Főiskola).

Personal life
He is married to Szilvia Sántha, a chemist. They have four children together — two daughters, Vanda and Sarolta, and two sons, Mihály and Sámuel. Varga is a member of the Reformed Church in Hungary.

References

External links
Mihály Varga's homepage
Biography
Biography

|-

|-

|-

1965 births
Corvinus University of Budapest alumni
Fidesz politicians
Finance ministers of Hungary
Living people
Members of the National Assembly of Hungary (1990–1994)
Members of the National Assembly of Hungary (1994–1998)
Members of the National Assembly of Hungary (1998–2002)
Members of the National Assembly of Hungary (2002–2006)
Members of the National Assembly of Hungary (2006–2010)
Members of the National Assembly of Hungary (2010–2014)
Members of the National Assembly of Hungary (2014–2018)
Members of the National Assembly of Hungary (2018–2022)
Members of the National Assembly of Hungary (2022–2026)
People from Karcag
Hungarian Calvinist and Reformed Christians
Members of the Fourth Orbán Government
Members of the fifth Orbán government